Hazlewood is a hamlet in the English county of North Yorkshire.

External links 

Villages in North Yorkshire